Rajesh Anand Bhagwan, also known as Rajesh Bhagwan, is a Mauritian politician.

Occupation
Rajesh Bhagwan worked as a meter-reader for the Central Electricity Board (Mauritius) before joining politics.

Political career
Rajesh Bhagwan was elected as Member of Parliament in Constituency No.20 Beau Bassin Petite Rivière for the first time in 1983. Since then has been re-elected at every General Election that has been held in that Constituency of Mauritius. He also holds the office of Secrétaire Général of the MMM.

References

Living people
Mauritian Militant Movement politicians
Members of the National Assembly (Mauritius)
Mauritian Hindus
People from Plaines Wilhems District
Year of birth missing (living people)